Smolari is a village in the municipality of Novo Selo, North Macedonia.

Demographics
According to the 2002 census, the village had a total of 659 inhabitants. Ethnic groups in the village include:

Macedonians 659

References

Villages in Novo Selo Municipality